An electroosmotic pump (EOP), or EO pump, is used for generating flow or pressure by use of an electric field.  One application of this is removing liquid flooding water from channels and gas diffusion layers and direct hydration of the proton exchange membrane in the membrane electrode assembly (MEA) of the proton exchange membrane fuel cells.

Principle
Electroosmotic pumps are fabricated from silica nanospheres or hydrophilic porous glass, the pumping mechanism is generated by an external electric field applied on an electric double layer (EDL), generates high pressures (e.g., more than 340 atm (34 MPa) at 12 kV applied potentials) and high flow rates (e.g., 40 ml/min at 100 V in a pumping structure less than 1 cm³ in volume). EO pumps are compact, have no moving parts, and scale favorably with fuel cell design. The EO pump might drop the parasitic load of water management in fuel cells from 20% to 0.5% of the fuel cell power.

Types

Cascaded electroosmotic pumps
High pressures or high flow rates are obtained by positioning several regular electroosmotic pumps in series or parallel respectively.

Porous electroosmotic pump
Pumps based on porous media can be created using sintered glass or microporous polymer membranes  with appropriate surface chemistry.

Planar shallow electroosmotic pump
Planar shallow electroosmotic pumps are made of parallel shallow microchannels.

Electroosmotic micropumps 
Electroosmotic effects can also be induced without external fields in order to power micron-scale motion.  Bimetallic gold/silver patches have been shown to generate local fluid pumping by this mechanism when hydrogen peroxide is added to the solution.  A related motion can be induced by silver phosphate particles, which can be tailored to generate reversible firework behavior among other properties.

See also
Capillary electrophoresis
Electroosmotic flow
Glossary of fuel cell terms
Microfluidics
Micropump
Sol-gel

References

External links
Electroosmotic pump and its applications
Principles of electroosmotic pumps

Hydrogen technologies
Pumps
Microfluidics
Fuel cells